Mountain View is a census-designated place  in Luna County, New Mexico, United States. Its population was 122 as of the 2010 census. Mountain View had a post office from 1911 to 1914.

Like other areas in Luna County, the community is in the Deming Public Schools school district.

References

Census-designated places in New Mexico
Census-designated places in Luna County, New Mexico